, better known by her stage name , is a Japanese singer from Nagoya. Aspiring to become a musician since childhood, she began her music activities in 2003 upon passing an audition held by talent agency Horipro International. She made her major debut in 2005 under the Universal Music label with the release of her first single "Crazy Crazy Crazy". She would release two more singles under Universal Music, before transferring to Victor Entertainment in 2008. That same year, she had her break as the singing voice of the character Sheryl Nome in the anime series Macross Frontier.

May'n's musical style varies in genre, ranging from pop and rock, to dance music and R&B. Her music has been featured in anime series such as Macross Frontier, Aria the Scarlet Ammo, Accel World, Aquarion Logos, and Restaurant to Another World. She has also performed at several music events in Japan, Asia, Europe, and North America. In 2013, she represented Japan at the ABU TV Song Festival in Vietnam.

Early life and childhood 
Nakabayashi was born in Nagoya on October 21, 1989. She had become interested in music at an early age, and had been singing at least since she was three years old. She had also had an interest in anime series such as Sailor Moon since her childhood, particularly after an occurrence where she heard the series' theme "Moonlight Densetsu" at a karaoke bar. In 2003, at the age of 13, she participated in the 28th  and out of the 34,911 hopefuls, became one of the four who survived the final eliminations.

Career 
Nakabayashi debuted under the Universal Music Japan label with the release of her first single "Crazy Crazy Crazy" on April 27, 2005; the single was later re-released on June 1 of that year with an additional track. This was followed by the release of the digital single "Happy" in December of that year. Her second single, "Sympathy", was released on August 3, 2005. She then released her third single "Fallin' in or Not" on September 27, 2006, the title track of which was used as the ending theme for the anime series Love Get Chu.

Nakabayashi transferred to Victor Entertainment in 2008 and began using the stage name May'n. That same year, she gained popularity after being cast as the singing voice of the character Sheryl Nome in the anime television series Macross Frontier. She later released two singles for the series,  and "Lion", with each placing in the Top 3 on the Oricon Weekly Chart in their debut week. She was invited to perform "Iteza Gogo Kuji Don't be late" and "Northern Cross" at Animelo Summer Live 2008. She then gave her first live performance outside Japan in Singapore at Anime Festival Asia in November of that year. She has since become a regular guest at this event as well, also appearing at its iterations in Malaysia, Indonesia, and Thailand.

In January 2009, May'n released the mini-album May'n Street, which reached number 2 on the Oricon Weekly Chart in its first week. She then released the single  on May 6, 2009; the title track is used as the opening theme to the anime series Shangri-La. Her first full album Styles was released in November 2009; the album reached number 7 on the Oricon Weekly charts. In January 2010, she performed her first solo Nippon Budokan concert, which sold out in only one day. In March of the same year, she held her first tour of Asia, with concerts in Malaysia, Hong Kong, and Taiwan. This was followed in July by a 17-city summer tour of Japan. She released her second album Cosmic Cuune in November 2010 as her character Sheryl Nome. In late 2010, she was chosen to record the theme song for the film Incite Mill -7 Day Death Game-. In February 2011, she released her 3D live documentary movie May'n The Movie: Phonic Nation, and later that month released her third album If you..., which made number 7 on the Oricon Weekly Chart. In March of that year, she held her second solo Budokan concert. She then made an appearance at Japan Expo in Paris. She also sang the song "Mr. Super Future Star", which was used as the theme song for the Capcom game E.X. Troopers.

In 2011 and 2012, May'n collaborated with music artist Daisuke Asakura for the singles "Scarlet Ballet", which was used as the opening theme to the anime series Aria the Scarlet Ammo, and "Chase the world", which was used as the opening theme to the anime series Accel World. She released her fourth album Heat on March 21, 2012. She represented Japan in October 2013 at the ABU TV Song Festival 2013 in Hanoi, Vietnam with her single "Vivid". She was scheduled to make an appearance at Animax Carnival Philippines in December 2013, but the event was cancelled as a result of the effects of Typhoon Haiyan.

In 2014, May'n released her fifth album New World. She then returned to the United States with a solo concert in San Francisco and a performance at Union Square for J-Pop Summit Festival 2014.

May'n performed "Yamaidare darlin'", which was used as the first opening theme to the 2015 anime television series Aquarion Logos, and later performed the songs "Yoake no Logos", which was used as the second opening theme to Aquarion Logos, and the series' second ending theme "Hontō no Koe wo Anata ni Azuketakute", which was performed with Haruka Chisuga. She released her fifth album Powers of Voice on September 7, 2015. She would also make an appearance at Animax Carnival Malaysia in March of that year. In 2016, she performed the song "Belief", which was used as the opening theme to the anime television series Taboo Tattoo. She performed the song "Hikari Aru Basho e", which is used as the ending theme to the 2016 anime television series Izetta: The Last Witch. She also appeared at Animax Carnival Philippines in October of that year.

In 2017, May'n collaborated with idol unit Wake Up, Girls! in performing the song "One in a Billion", which was used as the opening theme to the anime television series Restaurant to Another World. She made an appearance at Illinois' Anime Central event in May, and she also appeared at Anime Festival Asia Indonesia in August as a replacement for singer Ami Wajima, who had cancelled her appearance for health reasons. She released her sixth album Peace of Smile on October 30, 2017. She returned to Singapore in March 2018 for the anime event Anime Garden, and she appeared at the Anisong World Matsuri event in Los Angeles in July of that year. In September 2018, May'n and Megumi Nakajima, who played the role of Ranka Lee in Macross Frontier, released the single "Good job!"; it was their first Macross-related single in seven years. She released an album titled Yell!! and a single titled  on July 31, 2019; "Kiba to Tsubasa" was used as the ending theme to the anime series Kochoki: Wakaki Nobunaga. She appeared at Cosplay Mania in the Philippines in September 2019.

In 2022, May'n became a part of the mixed-media project D4DJ, voicing the role of Neo of the in-universe group Abyssmare.

Musical style and influences 
May'n's musical style varies in genre, ranging from pop and rock, to dance music and R&B, and she cites artists such as Britney Spears, Madonna, Janet Jackson, and Namie Amuro as her musical influences. She also cites her relationship with composer Yoko Kanno as a major factor in her career.

In interviews with Anime News Network, May'n discussed her performance style and her experiences working with composers such as Kanno and Daisuke Asakura. She stated that her initial preferred genres were R&B and dance music, but collaborating with Kanno made her realize that her voice fit rock songs more. Whenever she performs theme songs for anime, she would try to "feel each character's heart." Since she had been cast as the singing voice of the character Sheryl Nome, she had a desire to "become" the character, although Kanno would give her advice that she should stop acting too much like Sheryl and instead be herself. As for her involvement with Asakura, she stated that she admired Asakura's work and that collaborating with him allowed her to explore new music styles that she had not attempted before. May'n also explained the reason for her stage name. She stated that she began using the name "May'n" when she started performing songs for anime series, and that the name was a play on the English word "main", as she wanted her songs to be seen as "main themes" to her audiences, and for her fans to consider her their "main singer".

May'n discussed the production of her song "You", used as the opening theme to the anime series The Ancient Magus' Bride, in a February 2018 interview with DaVinci News. She said that the song was meant to represent the relationship between the series' characters Chise and Elias, and in particular Elias' representation as a dark and sad character. She notes that, as the single was released during her 10th anniversary, she wanted to challenge herself to "get better" in singing, and to improve her weaknesses.

Discography

Albums

EPs

Singles

Digital singles

DVDs and Blu-ray disks

Collaborations

References

External links 

 Official website 
 Official blog 
 Universal Music official site 
 Victor Entertainment official site 
 

1989 births
Living people
People from Nagoya
Japanese women pop singers
Musicians from Aichi Prefecture
Anime musicians
Horipro artists
21st-century Japanese singers
21st-century Japanese women singers